Patrick Russell (born 4 January 1993) is a Danish professional ice hockey forward. He is currently playing with Linköping HC of the Swedish Hockey League (SHL). He has previously played with the Edmonton Oilers of the National Hockey League (NHL).

Playing career
Russell played for the youth teams of the Gentofte Stars in his native Denmark and saw the ice in Denmark's second-tier league before moving to Sweden in 2009. He joined the youth ranks of Linköping HC, where he developed his game until 2013. Russell then headed over the pond and spent the 2013–14 season with the Waterloo Black Hawks of the United States Hockey League. Making 67 appearances for the Black Hawks, he collected 34 goals and 23 assists, helping the Waterloo side win the Anderson Cup and reaching the Clark Cup Championship Series.

From 2014 to 2016, Russell attended St. Cloud State University. He made the 2015 All-NCHC Rookie Team and in his sophomore year, helped the Huskies capture the National Collegiate Hockey Conference title, tallying 20 goals and 21 assists in 41 contests on the season.

On 9 May 2016, Russell signed a two-year entry-level deal with the Edmonton Oilers of the National Hockey League (NHL).

Russell's NHL debut came on 17 November 2018 for the Oilers against the Calgary Flames. Russell's total ice time was 8 minutes and 37 seconds, and he recorded 0 shots on goal. He is the 12th Danish player to play in the NHL.

Leaving North America, Russell signed a two-year contract with former Swedish junior club Linköping HC of the SHL on 1 August 2021.

International play
Russell represented Denmark's junior national teams at the under-18 and under-20 level, where he served as a team captain. In 2017, he played his first World Championship with the men's national team.

Career statistics

Regular season and playoffs

International

References

External links

1993 births
Living people
Bakersfield Condors players
Danish expatriate sportspeople in Canada
Danish expatriate sportspeople in the United States
Danish ice hockey right wingers
Edmonton Oilers players
Expatriate ice hockey players in Canada
Expatriate ice hockey players in the United States
Linköping HC players
Ice hockey players at the 2022 Winter Olympics
Olympic ice hockey players of Denmark
People from Rudersdal Municipality
St. Cloud State Huskies men's ice hockey players
Undrafted National Hockey League players
Waterloo Black Hawks players
Sportspeople from the Capital Region of Denmark